Goalball at the 2024 Summer Paralympics will be held in the Stade Pierre de Coubertin (Pierre de Coubertin Stadium) in Paris, France.  

Athletes and officials are likely to reside at the Paralympic Village at the commune of L'Île-Saint-Denis.

Qualifying

Change to format

Both men's and women's tournaments were used to qualify ten teams each for the 2020 Tokyo Games.  On 19 November 2021, the International Paralympic Committee (IPC) announced the only eight male and eight female national teams would be selected.  This might reduce the round-robin games of two divisions with four pools in total, for two sexes, from 40 to 24 games.

Men

Women

References

2024 Summer Paralympics
2024 Summer Paralympics events
2024
2024 in French sport